The Revolt of Salar-al-Daulah was a revolt against the government of the Sublime State of Persia in the 1910s. It began in 1911. It was led by Salar-al-Daulah, a brother of a former shah, Mohammad Ali Shah Qajar. By 17 July, he had occupied Senneh. Salar attempted to advance on Tehran from Kermanshah, but was defeated. After the formation of a new Persian cabinet on 26 July 1911, the Persian government deployed Bakhtiari troops against Salar-al-Daulah in western Persia. The Bakhtiari offensive was marked by widespread looting. The revolt was finally quelled in 1913.

References 

Rebellions in Iran
Conflicts in 1911
Conflicts in 1912
Conflicts in 1913
1911 in Iran
1912 in Iran
1913 in Iran
Qajar Iran